Bardar is a large commune located 15 kilometres south-west of Chișinău, in Ialoveni District, Moldova. The sumptuous landscape of the region, amid scenic hills dressed in vineyards, orchards and forests gives the area an overwhelming beauty.

Notable people
 Nicolae Grosu served as Member of the Moldovan Parliament (1917–1918)
 Aurel David a well-known painter for the Eminescu tree
 Vasile Iov pan flute musician 
 Petru Vutcărău director, actor, artistic director of "Mihai Eminescu" National Theater
 Andrei Sava composer
 Mihai Toderaşcu interpreter and composer
 Angela Gonza reporter most known on PROTV Chisinau channel
 Corina Ţepeş light musician
 Nicolae Roşioru poet, director of "Local Time" newspaper
 Petru Macovei director of the Independent Press Association
 Monica Babuc Minister of Culture, Education and Research
 Octavian Calmic Deputy Prime Minister, former Minister of Economy and Infrastructure
 Valeriu Herţa graphic designer, member of the Union of Fine Artists

References

Villages of Ialoveni District